The Bibans or Biban Range (Kabylian: Tiggoura,  or Les Bibans) are a chain of mountains in northern Algeria, bordering the south of Kabylie.

Geography
The highest summits are 1862 m high Mansoura and 1832 m high Choukchout. Located to the east of the Blidean Atlas and to the west of the Hodna Mountains, the Bibans are a subrange of the Tell Atlas, part of the Atlas Mountain System.

The strategic Iron Gates mountain passes are located in the range and gave their name to the Biban Mountains. The main gorge is the deep Bab al-Kabir (Big Door), cut by the Ouadi Chebba, through which the railway line between Algiers and Constantine passes. The Bab al-Saghir (Little Door) of the Oadi Buktun is located 3.5 km to the east.

Some authors claim that the range was known as El Ouennougha before the French colonization of Algeria. Traditionally these mountains have been populated by Kabyle people. In present days the Kabyle populations are found in the centre and the eastern part of the range, while the western end is home to Arabophone communities. Local people use to practice goat rearing and beekeeping, as well as growing olives for the production of olive oil. Ancient oil mills have been preserved in certain villages.

Protected areas
The 200,000 ha Saharan Atlas National Park is a protected area located near Hammam Dhalaa on the southeastern side of the range, 15 km north of M'Sila. Established in 1992, it is a refuge for about hundred Cuvier's gazelles.

See also
List of mountains in Algeria
Iron Gates (Algeria)
Petite Kabylie

References

External links

Mountain ranges of Algeria
Mountain ranges of the Atlas Mountains

National parks of Algeria